Juliet is a character in Shakespeare's play Romeo and Juliet.

Juliet may also refer to:

Songs
 "Juliet" (Lawson song), 2013
 "Juliet" (The Four Pennies song), 1964
"Juliet" (Modern Talking song)
"Juliet" (The Oak Ridge Boys song)
"Juliet" (Robin Gibb song)
"Juliet", a song by Nana Mizuki from the album Magic Attraction
"Juliet", a song by The Pillows from the album Runners High
"Juliet", a song by Stevie Nicks from the album The Other Side of the Mirror
"Juliet", a song by Sonata Arctica from the album The Days of Grays
"Juliet", a song by LMNT
"Juliet", a song by Cavetown

People with the given name
Juliet Agasha, Ugandan politician
Juliet Aubrey, British actress
Juliet Cadzow, British actress
Juliet Cesario, American character actress
Juliet Frankland (1929–2013), British mycologist
Juliet Haslam (born 1969), Australian field hockey player
Juliet Huddy (born 1969),  American journalist
Juliet Hulme (born 1938), murderer
Juliet Landau, American actress
Juliet Man Ray, model and muse to Man Ray
Juliet Richardson (born 1980), American musician
Juliet Simms, American musician
Juliet Stevenson (born 1956), English actress

Fictional characters
Juliet Burke, a character in the TV drama Lost
Juliet Sharp, a character in the TV drama Gossip Girl
Juliet Starling, a character in Lollipop Chainsaw
Juliet the Valentine Fairy, a character in Rainbow Magic
Juliet Van Heusen, a character in Wizards of Waverly Place
Juliet Butler, a character in the Artemis Fowl series
Juliet Hobbes, a character in The Simpsons
Juliet O'Hara, a character in the TV dramedy Psych
Juliet, a character in Shakespeare's play Measure for Measure
Juliet Douglas, the alias utilized by Sloth, a character in the Fullmetal Alchemist anime series
Juliet Nightingale, a character in Hollyoaks

Other uses
Juliet, a 1954 font designed by Aldo Novarese
Juliet cap, a form of headgear
Juliet (moon), a moon of the planet Uranus
Juliet (PRR) a scenery baggage car of the Pennsylvania Railroad
Juliet (novel), a novel by Anne Fortier
Tropical Storm Juliet, name has been used for two tropical cyclones.

See also
 Romeo and Juliet (disambiguation)
 Joliet (disambiguation)
 Joliette (disambiguation)
 Juliette (disambiguation)
 Giulietta (disambiguation)

bg:Жулиета
ru:Джульетта

English feminine given names